Guysborough County is a county in the Canadian province of Nova Scotia.

History
Taking its name from the Township of Guysborough, which was named in honour of Sir Guy Carleton, Guysborough County was created when Sydney County (Antigonish County) was divided in 1836.

Guysborough County has had a large Black population since 1784. The Black Nova Scotian community in Guysborough is unique in that they descend almost entirely from Black Loyalists. In 1872, there were 918 residents of African ancestry in Guysborough.

In 1840, Guysborough County was subdivided into two districts for court sessisonal purposes – Guysborough and St. Mary's. In 1863, the boundary between Halifax County and Guysborough County was altered and a polling district was added to Guysborough County. In 1879, the two districts were incorporated as district municipalities.

The last racially segregated school in Canada closed in 1983 in Guysborough County.

Demographics 

Population trend

Mother tongue language (2011)

Ethnic Groups (2006)

Communities

Towns
Mulgrave

District municipalities
Municipality of the District of Guysborough
Municipality of the District of St. Mary's

Access routes
Highways and numbered routes that run through the county, including external routes that start or finish at the county limits:

Highways
None

Trunk Routes

Collector Routes:

External Routes:
None

See also
List of communities in Nova Scotia
Black Lake listings within Nova Scotia.

References

External links

Photographs of historic monuments in Guysborough County
Melford International Terminal
Authentic Seacoast Properties

 
1836 establishments in Nova Scotia